The Bahamas Great Abaco Classic is a golf tournament on the Korn Ferry Tour, played at the Abaco Club on Winding Bay in the Bahamas. It is one of two Korn Ferry Tour events in the Bahamas, along with The Bahamas Great Exuma Classic. Both events were first played in January 2017 starting on a Sunday and finishing on a Wednesday, rather than the standard Thursday–Sunday schedule. Due to the ongoing recovery efforts on the island from Hurricane Dorian, the 2020 edition was temporarily moved to Baha Mar in Nassau, and retained the Abaco Classic name in its title.

Winners

Bolded golfers graduated to the PGA Tour via the Korn Ferry Tour regular-season money list.

References

External links

Coverage on the Korn Ferry Tour's official site

Korn Ferry Tour events
Golf tournaments in the Bahamas
Recurring sporting events established in 2017
2017 establishments in the Bahamas